FareStart is a nonprofit organization in Seattle, Washington, US, that provides restaurant industry job training for the disadvantaged and homeless. FareStart originally started as a for-profit provider of meals to homeless shelters under the name Common Meals, but became a non-profit in 1992. Common Meals was established in 1988 by David Lee.

Notes

References

External links
FareStart website
Catalyst Kitchens website

Charities based in Washington (state)
Non-profit organizations based in Seattle
Hunger relief organizations
Homelessness charities